Guilty of Mind is a Chinese suspense crime film based on the novel Guilty of Mind: Portrait by Lei Mi, starring Li Yifeng, Liao Fan and Wan Qian. The film was released in China on August 11, 2017.

Synopsis
A gifted criminal profiler, Fang Mu was asked to assist the police in solving a bizarre campus serial killing. Working together with Police Captain Tai Wei, Fang Mu tries to crack down the murder cases, but he unknowingly gets embroiled in a battle of wits.

Cast
Li Yifeng as Fang Mu
Liao Fan as Tai Wei
Wan Qian as Qiao Lan
Li Chun as Chen Xi 
Yu Lang as Luo Yi
Chang Kuo-chu

References

External links

Chinese suspense films
Chinese crime films
Films based on Chinese novels
2017 films
2017 crime films